The Borough of Oswestry was a local government district with borough status in Shropshire, England, from medieval times until its abolition in 2009. Until 1974 the borough just covered the town of Oswestry itself. The borough was enlarged in 1974 to also include the surrounding rural area, although it was the smallest post-1974 district of Shropshire.

Its council was based in Oswestry, the only town and largest settlement in the borough. Villages in the borough included Morda, St Martin's, Whittington, Gobowen, Pant, Trefonen and Ruyton XI Towns.

The district and its council were abolished on 1 April 2009 when the new Shropshire unitary authority was established, as part of the 2009 structural changes to local government in England.

History
The town of Oswestry was an ancient borough, governed under the terms of various charters dating back to at least 1398. The borough was reformed to become a municipal borough under the Municipal Corporations Act 1835. By the mid-twentieth century some municipal boroughs were considered too small to efficiently provide all the services expected of them, and so the government introduced the concept of rural boroughs under the Local Government Act 1958. This allowed a small municipal borough to merge with a neighbouring rural district, whilst allowing the former municipal borough to retain some of its privileges, such as the ability to appoint a mayor. In other regards, such rural boroughs were comparable to parish councils. Oswestry became a rural borough on 1 April 1967, becoming part of the surrounding Oswestry Rural District.

On 1 April 1974, under the Local Government Act 1972, the Oswestry Rural District became a non-metropolitan district, and the borough status which had previously only applied to the town of Oswestry itself was transferred to the larger district, allowing the new district council to take the name Oswestry Borough Council.

The borough of Oswestry and its council were abolished on 1 April 2009, when the new Shropshire Council unitary authority was established, as part of the 2009 structural changes to local government in England.

Political control
The first elections to the enlarged council were held in 1973, initially operating as a shadow authority until the new arrangements came into effect on 1 April 1974. Political control of the council from 1974 until its abolition in 2009 was held by the following parties:

Leadership
The last leader of the council was David Lloyd, a Conservative.

Council elections
1973 Oswestry Borough Council election
1976 Oswestry Borough Council election (New ward boundaries)
1979 Oswestry Borough Council election
1983 Oswestry Borough Council election
1987 Oswestry Borough Council election
1991 Oswestry Borough Council election
1995 Oswestry Borough Council election
1999 Oswestry Borough Council election
2003 Oswestry Borough Council election (New ward boundaries)
2007 Oswestry Borough Council election

By-election results

References

By-election results 

Council elections in Shropshire
Oswestry
District council elections in England
Districts of England established in 1974
English districts abolished in 2009
Borough of
Former non-metropolitan districts of Shropshire
Former boroughs in England